A whisker is a type of mammalian hair.

Whisker or Whiskers may also refer to:

Arts and entertainment 
 Whiskers, the main family group in the British television show Meerkat Manor 
 Whiskers, a fictional winged cat in Michael Moorcock's Multiverse
 Whiskers, a fictional villain in The Tale of Samuel Whiskers or The Roly-Poly Pudding by Beatrix Potter
 Captain Whiskers, villain of the video game Sonic Rush Adventure
 Mr. Whiskers, a character in the American animated television series Brandy & Mr. Whiskers

People 
 Alexander Whisker (1819–1907), New Zealand soldier and diarist
 Andrew Mowatt Whisker (1907–1992), Canadian lumberman and politician

Other uses 
 Whisker (horse) (1812–1832), a thoroughbred racehorse and winner of the 1815 Epsom Derby
 Whisker (metallurgy), a strong hair-shaped protrusion on a metal's surface
 Whisker, in statistics an element of a box plot
 Whisker, a project of the Cult of the Dead Cow which checked for security vulnerabilities in web servers
 "Whiskers", slang for human facial hair on the chin or cheeks
 Lake Whisker, a lake of Wisconsin

See also 
 Whiskas, a brand of cat food
 Whiskering, an operation in category theory between a functor and a natural transformation